Nadine Aubry is an American engineer.  She previously served as Provost and Senior Vice President of Tufts University.  She is an elected Fellow of the American Association for the Advancement of Science, the American Society of Mechanical Engineers, the American Physical Society, the American Institute of Aeronautics and Astronautics, the National Academy of Inventors, and the American Academy of Arts and Sciences. In 2009, she was the Raymond J. Lane Distinguished Professor and University Professor at Carnegie Mellon University.

Aubry is also an elected member of the National Academy of Engineering (2011) for contributions to low-dimensional models of turbulence and microfluidic devices, and for leadership in engineering education.

References

20th-century births
Living people
American engineers
Cornell University alumni
Northeastern University faculty
Fellows of the American Academy of Arts and Sciences
Fellows of the American Association for the Advancement of Science
Fellows of the American Institute of Aeronautics and Astronautics
Fellows of the American Physical Society
Fellows of the American Society of Mechanical Engineers
21st-century American engineers
Year of birth missing (living people)
Place of birth missing (living people)